See Mercy Hospital for other medical facilities with the Mercy name.

Mercy Hospital for Women, is based in Heidelberg adjacent to the Austin Hospital. The hospital offers obstetric, gynaecological and neonatal services and has one of only four neonatal intensive care units in Victoria. The Neonatal Intensive Care Unit is co-located with the Special Care Nursery and collectively they care for some of Victoria's most unwell babies.  The hospital was opened in 1934.

Mercy Hospital for Women provides both public and private patient care through maternity services, neonatology and paediatrics, perioperative services, specialist and sub-specialist gynaecology, women's health and associated health, support and diagnostic services. It is a major teaching hospital and specialist referral centre with the medical, nursing, midwifery and allied health expertise to treat the most complex obstetric, neonatal and gynaecological cases.

The hospital is affiliated with the University of Melbourne's Clinical School of the Department of Obstetrics and Gynaecology and La Trobe University School of Midwifery and Neonatal Nursing. The hospital is administered by Mercy Health, a Catholic not for profit organisation founded by the Sisters of Mercy.

References and notes

Hospital buildings completed in 2005
Hospitals established in 1934
Teaching hospitals in Australia
Hospitals in Melbourne
1934 establishments in Australia
Women in Melbourne
Buildings and structures in the City of Banyule
Heidelberg, Victoria